Menmaatre Ramesses XI (also written Ramses and Rameses) reigned from 1107 BC to 1078 BC or 1077 BC and was the tenth and final pharaoh of the Twentieth Dynasty of Egypt and as such, was the last king of the New Kingdom period. He ruled Egypt for at least 29 years although some Egyptologists think he could have ruled for as long as 30. The latter figure would be up to 2 years beyond this king's highest known date of Year 10 of the Whm Mswt era or Year 28 of his reign. One scholar, Ad Thijs, has suggested that Ramesses XI could even have reigned as long as 33 years.

It is believed that Ramesses ruled into his Year 29 since a graffito records that the general and High Priest of Amun Piankh returned to Thebes from Nubia on III Shemu day 23—or just 3 days into what would have been the start of Ramesses XI's 29th regnal year. Piankh is known to have campaigned in Nubia during Year 28 of Ramesses XI's reign (or Year 10 of the Whm Mswt) and would have returned home to Egypt in the following year.

Background
Ramesses XI was once thought to be the son of Ramesses X by Queen Tyti who was a King's Mother, King's Wife and King's Daughter in her titles. However, recent scholarly research into certain copies of parts of the Harris papyrus (or Papyrus BM EA 10052)--made by Anthony Harris—which discusses a harem conspiracy against Ramesses III reveals that Tyti was rather a queen of pharaoh Ramesses III instead. Hence, Ramesses XI's mother was not Tyti and although he could have been a son of his predecessor, this is not established either. Ramesses XI is believed to have married Tentamun, the daughter of Nebseny, with whom he is assumed to have fathered Duathathor-Henuttawy—the future wife of the high priest Pinedjem I. Ramesses XI may have had another daughter named Tentamun who became king Smendes' future wife in the next dynasty.

Sometime during his reign, the High Priest of Amun, Amenhotep, was ousted from office by Pinehesy, the Viceroy of Kush who for some time took control of the Thebais. Although this “suppression of the High Priest of Amun” used to be dated quite early in the reign (prior to year 9 of the reign), recently the communis opinio has changed to the view that it took place only shortly before the start of the Whm Mswt or Renaissance, an era which was inaugurated in regnal Year 19, probably to stress the return of normal conditions following the coup of Pinehesy.

The whm-mswt era

Ramesses XI's reign is notable for a large number of important papyri that have been discovered, including the Adoption Papyrus, which mentions regnal years 1 and 18 of his reign; Pap. B.M. 10052, Pap. Mayer A, Pap. B.M. 10403 and Pap. B.M. 10383 (the last four containing the accounts of tomb-robbery trials conducted during the first two years of the Whm Mswt); Pap. Ambras (containing a list of documents which were repurchased in year 6 of the Whm Mswt, after having been stolen from some temple archive, most probably during the chaotic period of the suppression of the High Priest of Amun Amenhotep); the Turin Taxation Papyrus, of an unspecified year 12; Pap. B.M. 10068, which includes on its verso two lists, called the House-list (from an unspecified year 12) and the Srmt-list (undated, but slightly later than the Houselist); Pap. B.M. 9997, of an unspecified year 14 and 15; and an entire series of Late Ramesside Letters written by -among others- the scribes of the Necropolis Dhutmose, Butehamun, and the High Priest Piankh. Late Ramesside Letter no. 9 establishes that the Whm Mswt period lasted into a 10th year (which more or less equates year 28 proper of Ramesses XI).

Ad Thijs, in a GM 173 paper, notes that the House-list, which is anonymously dated to Year 12 of Ramesses XI (i.e., the document was compiled in either Year 12 of the pre-Renaissance period or during the Whm Mswt era itself), mentions two officials: the Chief Doorkeeper Pnufer, and the Chief Warehouseman Dhutemhab.  These individuals were recorded as only an ordinary Doorkeeper and Warehouseman in Papyri BM 10403 and BM 10052 respectively, which are explicitly dated to Year 1 and 2 of the Whm Mswt period. This would suggest at first glance that the Year 12 House-list postdates these two documents and was created in Year 12 of the Whm Mswt era instead (or Regnal Year 30 proper of Ramesses XI), which would account for these two individuals' promotions. Thijs proceeds to use several anonymous Year 14 and 15 dates in another papyrus, BM 9997, to argue that Ramesses XI lived at least into his 32nd and 33rd Regnal Years (or Years 14 and 15 of the Whm Mswt). This document mentions a certain Sermont, who was only titled an ordinary Medjay (Nubian 'policeman') in the Year 12 House-list but is called "Chief of the Medjay" in Papyrus BM 9997. Sermont's promotion would thus mean that BM 9997 postdates the House-list Papyrus and must be placed late in the Renaissance period. If true, then Ramesses XI should have survived into his 33rd Regnal Year or Year 15 of the Whm Mswt era before dying.

However, one could argue that there are occasional inconsistencies in the description of an individual's precise title even within the same source document itself: Whereas Papyrus Mayer A several times mentions a “Dhuthope, Chief Doorkeeper of the temple of Amun”, in col. 5, line 15 this same individual is clearly presented as a mere “Doorkeeper”, which would strongly weaken Thijs’ case. On the other hand, as Goelet notes with regard to this last entry: “instead of recounting the usual beatings and confessions, the record simply states: ‘There was brought the doorkeeper Djehuty-hotep’”.
Since there are no further details added, which is an anomaly within the papyrus, this suggests that the pertinent entry was abandoned by the scribe, perhaps because he realised that he had made a mistake. Nevertheless, Thijs' case for a Year 33 proper for Ramesses XI should be treated with caution. Since there are two attested promotions of individuals in 2 separate papyri, however, there is a possibility that Ramesses XI did live into his 33rd regnal Year.

Thijs in his GM 173 paper, also demonstrated that the House-list and the Turin Taxation papyrus were close in time to each other since both documents mention a year 12 date and name certain individuals such as the chief of the Medjay Nesamun, the herdsman Penhasi and the fisherman Kadore. Due to this connection, Thijs argued that the Taxation Papyrus also belonged to the whm-mswt era. However, this would imply that in year 12 of the whm-mswt the viceroy Pinehesy returned to office to supervise in the collection of taxes in the Theban area, after he had become an enemy of the state earlier in the era, due to his role in temporarily suppressing the High Priest Amenhotep. In P. BM 10383 2, 4-5 (from year 2 of the whm-mswt, although the era is not explicitly mentioned in the heading) a certain Peison states that, sometime earlier, Pinehesy suppressed his (viz., Peison's) superior, which is taken by most Egyptologists as a reference to Pinehesy ousting the High Priest Amenhotep. 
Pinehesy was subsequently designated as an enemy in several papyri from year 1 and 2 of the whm-mswt (equalling year 19 and 20 proper of Ramesses XI) where his name was consistently associated "by the nDs [or] (‘bad’) bird as its determinative" in these papyri.

How exactly the anarchic period of the Suppression was ended and who ultimately forced Pinehesy out of Thebes is unknown, due to a lack of explicit sources. However, it seems that Pinehesy retreated to Nubia and succeeded in maintaining some sort of powerbase there for over a decade. 
In year 10 of the whm-mswt the then general and High Priest Piankh goes on an expedition to Nubia to "meet Pinehesy".
Although it is often postulated that it was the aim of this campaign to fight the former Viceroy, this is by no means certain. 
The sources are actually ambiguous on this point and the political climate may well have changed over the years. There is some evidence that at this time Piankh may no longer have been a loyal servant of Ramesses XI, which allows for the possibility that he was secretly negotiating with Pinehesy, possibly even plotting against the reigning king.
E. Wente wrote: "One has the impression that the viceroy and his Nubian troops were loyalists, for the remarks made by his opponent Piankh in letter No. 301 are quite disparaging of the pharaoh, Ramesses XI." In this letter, better known as LRL no. 21, Piankh remarks:

In the same letter and two others (LRL no. 34 and no. 35) Piankh gives the order to the Scribe of the Necropolis Tjaroy (=Dhutmose), the lady Nodjmet and a certain Payshuuben to secretly arrest and question two Medjay policemen about certain things they had apparently said:

Whereas Piankh would probably have had the authority to have people executed, it is noteworthy that his correspondents are explicitly urged to keep the matter secret. It has been argued that, given Piankh's supreme position at the time, the secrecy can only have concerned the king.  If this is correct, it follows that the political situation of the time must have been very complex, with Piankh possibly acting on some hidden agenda. Unfortunately, due to the very limited nature of the sources, the exact relationships between the three main protagonists, Piankh, Pinehesy and Ramesses XI remain far from clear. Some scholars believe that the Nubian campaign was part of an ongoing power struggle between the High Priest of Amun and the Viceroy of Kush However, it is equally possible that Piankh came to the rescue of Pinehesy against some common enemy. The verb often translated as "to attack (Pinehesy)" only means "to meet/ to go to". In fact, neither the aim of the expedition nor its outcome are beyond doubt. 
The issue is further complicated by the ongoing debate about [1] the order of High Priests (either Herihor before Piankh or Piankh before Herihor) and [2] the correct ascription (either to the pre-Renaissance period or to the whm-mswt itself) of several documents from the reign of Ramesses XI.

At present, Thijs' suggestion that Pinehesy was apparently rehabilitated by Ramesses XI in year 11 or 12 of the whm-mswt has only been explicitly accepted by the Egyptologist A. Dodson.

Length of reign
Neither the length of the Renaissance nor the ascription of certain documents from the reign of Ramesses XI are beyond dispute.
At present, Thijs' proposal that Papyrus BM 10054 dates to the Whm-Mswt has been confirmed by other scholars such as Von Beckerath and Annie Gasse—the latter in a JEA 87 (2001) paper which studied several newly discovered fragments belonging to this document. Consequently, it would appear that Ramesses XI's highest undisputed date is presently Year 11 of the Whm-Mswt (or Year 29 proper) of his reign, when Piankh's Nubian campaign terminated which means that the pharaoh had a minimum reign of 29 years when he died—-which can perhaps be extended to 30 years due to the "gap between the beginning of Dynasty 21 and the reign of Ramesses XI." with 33 years being hypothetical. Krauss and Warburton specifically write that due to the existence of this time gap,

 Egyptologists generally concede that his reign could have ended 1 or 2 years later than year 10 of the wehem mesut era = regnal year 28.

Aidan Dodson, however, allows for a 'year 15' of the Whm-Mswt on the basis of P. BM 9997.

Either during the reign of Ramesses XI or shortly afterwards, the village of Deir El Medina was abandoned, apparently because the Royal Necropolis was shifted northward to Tanis and there was no further need for their services at Thebes.

Late New Kingdom chronology of Ramesses XI
The conventional Egyptian chronology view is that Ramesses XI had an independent reign of between 29 and 30 or 33 full years between Ramesses X and Smendes before dying. Shortly before his death, he transferred Egypt's political capital to Tanis where he died and was buried by Smendes who succeeded him but only ruled Lower Egypt while Herihor ruled Upper Egypt as the High Priest of Egypt at Thebes. Thijs' separate proposal that the first 17 years of Ramesses XI's reign were entirely contemporary with the reigns of Ramesses IX (Years 5-19) and Ramesses X (Years 1-3) is not currently accepted by most Egyptologists except Aidan Dodson in his 2012 book Afterglow of Empire.

Burial
Sometime during this troubled period, Ramesses XI died under unknown circumstances. While he had a tomb prepared for himself in the Valley of the Kings (KV4), it was left unfinished and only partly decorated since Ramesses XI instead arranged to have himself buried away from Thebes, possibly near Memphis. This pharaoh's tomb, however, includes some unusual features, including four rectangular, rather than square, pillars in its burial chamber and an extremely deep central burial shaft– at over 30 feet or 10 metres long– which was perhaps designed as an additional security device to prevent tomb robbery. During the 21st dynasty, under the reign of the High Priest of Thebes, Pinedjem I, Ramesses XI's tomb was used as a workshop for processing funerary materials from the burials of Hatshepsut, Thutmose III and perhaps Thutmose I.  Ramesses XI's tomb has stood open since antiquity and was used as a dwelling by the Copts.

Since Ramesses XI had himself buried in Lower Egypt, Smendes rose to the kingship of Egypt, based on the well known custom that he who buried the king inherited the throne. Since Smendes buried Ramesses XI, he could legally assume the crown of Egypt and inaugurate the 21st Dynasty from his hometown at Tanis, even if he did not control Middle and Upper Egypt, which were now effectively in the hands of the High Priests of Amun at Thebes.

References

Further reading

 Darrell D. Baker, The Encyclopedia of the Egyptian Pharaohs, Volume I: Predynastic to the Twentieth Dynasty (3300–1069 BC), Bannerstone Press, London 2008, S. 334–336.
 Christian Cannuyer, Encore la Date de l'accession au Thrône de Ramsès XI, GM 132 (1993), 19-20
 Aidan Dodson, Afterglow of Empire, Egypt from the Fall of the New Kingdom to the Saite Renaissance, AUC Press 2012
 Klaus Ohlhafer, Zum Thronbesteigungsdatum Ramses' XI. und zur Abfolge der Grabräuberpapyri aus Jahr 1 und 2 whm-mswt, GM 135 (1993), 59-72
 Kim Ridealgh, A Tale of Semantics and Suppressions: Reinterpreting Papyrus Mayer A and the So-called 'War of the High Priest' during the Reign of Ramesses XI, SAK 43 (2014), 359-373
 Ad Thijs, "Some observations on the Tomb-Robbery Papyri", in: A.I. Blöbaum, M. Eaton-Krauss, A. Wüthrich (eds), Pérégrinations avec Erhart Graefe, Festschrift zu seinem 75. Geburtstag (Ägypten und Altes Testament 87), 519-536
 Edward Wente, The Suppression of the High Priest Amenhotep, JNES 25 (1966), 73-87

External links 

 

 
12th-century BC Pharaohs
11th-century BC Pharaohs
Pharaohs of the Twentieth Dynasty of Egypt
12th-century BC births
Year of birth unknown
1070s BC deaths
Ramesses X